Billbergia pohliana is a plant species in the genus Billbergia. This species is endemic to Brazil.

References

pohliana
Endemic flora of Brazil
Flora of the Atlantic Forest
Flora of Minas Gerais